Mumtaz Ahmad Qaisrani is a Pakistani politician who was a Member of the Provincial Assembly of the Punjab, from August 2016 to May 2018.

Early life and education
He was born on 14 October 1972 in Dera Ghazi Khan.

He graduated from University of Balochistan.

Political career
He was elected to the Provincial Assembly of the Punjab as a candidate of Pakistan Muslim League (Nawaz) from Constituency PP-240 (Dera Ghazi Khan-I) in by-polls held in August 2016.

References

Living people
Punjab MPAs 2013–2018
1972 births
Pakistan Muslim League (N) politicians